Mijloc may refer to:

Chiuruţul de Mijloc River, tributary of the Lăzarea River in Romania
Jora de Mijloc, commune in Orhei district, Moldova
Latoriţa de Mijloc River or Muncelu River or Muntinu River, a tributary of the Latoriţa River in Romania
Sărăcinul de Mijloc River, tributary of the Lotru River in Romania
Valea din Mijloc River, headwater of the Bistra River in Romania